Sant Quirc de Durro is an isolated chapel  situated in the village of Durro, in the territory of Vall de Boí, a commune in the valley with the same name and in Comarca of Alta Ribagorça in the north of Province of Lleida and the autonomous communities of Catalonia in Spain.
It is one of the best known places of Roman art in the valley and since November 2000, is part of the world heritage site of UNESCO with eight other Catalan Romanesque Churches of the Vall de Boí.

The chapel is situated at an altitude of 1498m, giving a very large panorama closed by the massifs of Comaloforno and those of Besiberri. A path allows  to reach the small lake of Durro at height of 2250m. It is dedicated to Saint Cyr of Tarse, child saint, son of Saint Julietta, both of them martyred in 304. A feast is celebrated in their honour on June 16.

Architecture 
The chapel presents a plan of unique nave, barrel vault ending with a semi-circular apse vaulted in semi-dome. Masonry work can be found around the tower of nave. The building has three openings: a narrow window in arrowslit in the centre of apse, an oculus above the apse, illuminating the nave and another arrowslit on east façade.

Interior 
In the interior of the Chapel, we find the antependium, representing the martyrdom of Saint Cyr of Tarse and of Saint Julietta, a major work of art of Catalan Romanesque painting, acquired in 1923 and exposed in Museu Nacional d'Art de Catalunya.

See also 
 Catalan Romanesque Churches of the Vall de Boí
 Vall de Boí

References

External links 
  Virtual visit of Sant Quirc de Durro

Churches in Catalonia
Romanesque architecture in Catalonia
Catalan art
Alta Ribagorça
World Heritage Sites in Catalonia
Vall de Boí